= Woxna mine =

Graphite mine in Sweden

- Location: Gävleborg County, Sweden
- Products: Graphite

The Woxna mine is one of the largest graphite mines in Sweden and in the world. The mine is located in the center of the country in Gävleborg County. The mine has estimated reserves of 6.93 million tonnes of ore 8.82% graphite.

Leading Edge Metarials Corp. completed a Preliminary Economic Assessment (PEA) Technical Study Report in 2013 under the requirements under National Instrument (NI 43-101).https://gosselinmining.com/projects/kringelgruvan-woxna-mine-graphite-pea/

The second PEA NI 43-101 Technical Report was finalized and published in 2021.https://gosselinmining.com/projects/woxna-graphite-mine-preliminary-economic-assessment/
